The East Princeton Village Historic District is a historic district encompassing a 19th-century industrial village center in Princeton, Massachusetts.  It is located roughly along Main Street between Beaman and Leominster Roads, and extends a short way along Leominster and Gleason Roads.  The village grew up around the Keyes Brook, which was used as a power source for mills in the mid-19th century, particularly the successful Stuart Chair Factory which was established in 1841.

The district was listed on the National Register of Historic Places in 2004.

See also
National Register of Historic Places listings in Worcester County, Massachusetts

References

Buildings and structures in Princeton, Massachusetts
Historic districts in Worcester County, Massachusetts
Historic districts on the National Register of Historic Places in Massachusetts
National Register of Historic Places in Worcester County, Massachusetts
1781 establishments in Massachusetts